Cirripectes stigmaticus, the red-streaked blenny, is a species of combtooth blenny from the Indo-Pacific. It occasionally makes its way into the aquarium trade.  This species reaches a length of  TL.

References

stigmaticus
Fish described in 1953